Tiit Kuusmik (born 3 March 1950 in Kiviõli) is an Estonian politician. He has been member of X and XI Riigikogu.

Since 2012, he has been the Mayor of Toila. He is a member of Estonian Centre Party.

References

Living people
1950 births
Estonian Centre Party politicians
Members of the Riigikogu, 2003–2007
Members of the Riigikogu, 2007–2011
Mayors of places in Estonia
Tallinn University alumni
People from Kiviõli